Sem Benelli (August 10, 1877 – December 18, 1949) was an Italian playwright, essayist and librettist.  He provided the texts for several noted Italian operas, including Italo Montemezzi's L'amore dei tre re and L'incantesimo, and Umberto Giordano's La cena delle beffe, based on Benelli's own play of the same title.  He was a native of Prato. His dramatic play of La Gorgona was first staged in Trieste in 1913.

The play The Jester's Supper was a great New York theatre success in 1919 under the title The Jest, starring Lionel and John Barrymore. In Italy Paola Pezzaglia was considered the best male protagonist of La cena delle beffe, after an incident in 1913 when the leading man collapsed before playing the character of Giannetto; she took his place achieving resounding success. Ever since Pezzaglia carried on doing the same role again and again.

He wrote the screenplay for the 1942 film The Jester's Supper based on his own famous play.

References

1877 births
1949 deaths
People from Prato
Italian dramatists and playwrights
Italian opera librettists
Italian male dramatists and playwrights
Manifesto of the Anti-Fascist Intellectuals